Monte Stino is a mountain in Lombardy, Italy. It has an elevation of 1,466 metres above sea level.

Mountains of the Alps
Mountains of Lombardy
Garda Mountains